Kelsey is a given name of English origin.  The name most probably derives from an Old English given name Ceolsige, which meant "ship's victory", or it could be a place name meaning "Cenel's island". "Cenel's Island" is a combination of the Old English word "cenel", meaning "fierce", and "eg", meaning island.

Kelsey was the 201st most popular name for girls born in the United States in 2007. It was among the top 50 most popular names for girls there in the 1990s. It was last ranked among the top 1,000 most common names for boys there in 1996. It was the 528th most common name for women in the United States in the 1990 census. Kelsey was ranked among the top 100 names for girls born in Scotland in 2007. It was also among the top 100 names for girls born in England and Wales in the late 1990s.

People with the given name include:

 Kelsey Asbille (born 1991), American actress
 Kelsey Bone (born 1991), American basketball player
 Kelsey Card (born 1992), American athlete
 Kelsey Davis (born 1987), American soccer player
 Kelsey Grammer (born 1955), American actor, director, and writer
 Kelsey Griffin (born 1987), American–Australian basketball player
 Kelsey Impicciche, American YouTuber
 Kelsey Mitchell (cyclist) (born 1993), Canadian track cyclist
 Kelsey Mitchell (basketball) (born 1995), American basketball player
 Kelsey Piper, American journalist
 Kelsey Plum (born 1994), American basketball player

See also
 Kelcy Warren (born 1955), American business executive and billionaire
 Kelcy Quarles (born 1992), American football player
 Kelcie Banks (born 1965), American boxer
 Kelsey Campbell (born 1985), American wrestler
 Kelsea Ballerini (born 1993), American country pop singer
 Kelsey (surname)
 Kelsie
 Kelsay
 Kelsay (surname)

Notes

English-language unisex given names
English-language feminine given names
English-language masculine given names
English feminine given names
English masculine given names